Turner is a common surname originating from Normandy, France, arriving in England after the Norman conquest with the earliest known records dated in the 12th century. It is the 28th-most common surname in the United Kingdom.

Most often it derives from an occupational name applied to a maker of small objects out of wood, metal or bone, by turning on a lathe (from Old French tornier, "lathe", ultimately from Latin). In this sense it is analogous to the German surnames Drexel, Drechsler, Dressler, and Dreyer,  Polish Tokarz, Finnish Sorvari, Russian Токарь (Tokarʼ) and related to English surnames such as Potter and Crocker.
Other occasional origins include Old French tournoieur, referring to someone either in charge of, or who participates in a tournament, and Turnhare, referring to a fast runner (one who can outrun a hare).

Early recordings of this surname include Ralph le Turner in the late 12th century.  The earliest recorded spelling of this family name dates from 1180 for "Warner le Turnur".

List of people with surname Turner

Captain Turner (disambiguation), various people

Common combinations of given name and surname "Turner"
These links lead to disambiguation pages

Alan Turner
Alfred Turner
Alex Turner
Andrew Turner
Ann Turner
Anna Turner
Anne Turner
Benjamin Turner
Brad Turner
Brian Turner
Charles Turner
Chris Turner
Cole Turner
Dan Turner
Daniel Turner
David Turner
Edward Turner
Fred Turner
George Turner
Henry Turner
Hugh Turner
Jack Turner
James Turner
Jay Turner
Jim Turner
Jimmy Turner
Joe Turner
Joel Turner
John Turner
Kyle Turner
Lynn Turner
Mark Turner
Matt Turner
Michael Turner
Neil Turner
Pat Turner
Paul Turner
Philip Turner
Richard Turner
Robert Turner
Roger Turner
Ron Turner
Steve Turner
Stuart Turner
Thomas Turner
William Turner

Less common first names

Adair Turner, Baron Turner of Ecchinswell (born 1955), British businessman and academic
Afida Turner (born 1976), French media personality and singer
Aidan Turner (born 1983), Irish actor
Augustus J. Turner (1818–1905), American musician
Alice Bellvadore Sams Turner (1859–1915), American physician, writer
Anthea Turner (born 1960), UK TV presenter
Arlin Turner (1909–1980), American biographer and scholar of American literature
Bake Turner, American football player who played wide receiver
Bertha L. Turner, American caterer, cookbook author, and community leader
Big Joe Turner (1911–1985), American blues singer
Billie Lee Turner (1925–2020), American botanist
Billie Lee Turner II, American geographer
Bolon B. Turner (1897–1987), United States Tax Court judge
Bonnie and Terry Turner, husband and wife sitcom writing team
Bree Turner (born 1977), American actress
Brock Turner, rapist
Bulldog Turner (1919–1998), American football player
Carmen E. Turner (1931-1992), American public administrator
Chester Novell Turner, African-American filmmaker
Charlotte Turner, top auditor in London
Clarence W. Turner (1866–1939), American politician
Clorinda Matto de Turner (1853–1909), Peruvian writer
Crystal Turner (1982–2021), American female murder victim
Curtis Turner (1924–1970), NASCAR driver
Dawson Turner (1775–1858), English banker and botanist
Debbie Turner (born 1956), American actress and former child star
Debbye Turner (born 1965), American TV anchor, veterinarian, talk show host and former beauty queen
Decherd Turner (1922–2002), American institutional book collector
De'Lance Turner (born 1995), American football player
Dennis Turner, Baron Bilston (1942–2014), British Member of Parliament
Derek Turner, English rugby league footballer
Des Turner (born 1939), British politician
D. J. Turner (born 1997), American football player
Douglas H. Turner, American chemist and professor
Dwayne Turner, British comic book artist
Edward Turner, British motorcycle and engine designer of Triumph Motorcycles 
Erik Turner (born 1964), guitarist for the American band Warrant
Ernest Sackville Turner (1909–2006), English journalist and author
Eugene S. Turner (1824–1915), American politician
Evan Turner (born 1988), American basketball player
Florence Turner (1885–1946), American actress
Florence Turner-Maley (1871-1962) American composer, singer and teacher
Frank Turner (born 1981), British musician
Frederick Jackson Turner (1861–1932), American historian
Garth Turner (born 1949), Canadian business journalist, broadcaster and politician
Geills Turner (born 1937), wife of John Turner, a prime minister of Canada
George Townsend Turner (1906–1979), philatelist of Washington, D.C.
 Gerald Turner, perpetrator of the murder of Lisa Ann French
Glenn Turner (cricketer) (born 1947), New Zealand cricketer
Grant Turner (1958–2023), New Zealand soccer player
Guinevere Turner (born 1968), American actor and writer
Hal Turner, internet radio talk show host
Harald Turner (1891–1947), German Nazi SS commander executed for war crimes
Harvey G. Turner (1822–1893), American politician
Hayden Turner (born 1966), Australian television presenter and zookeeper
Helen Alma Newton Turner (1908–1995), Australian geneticist and statistician
Helen Monro Turner (1901–1977), Scottish artist
Howard Turner (1897–1976), American football player
Hugh Thackeray Turner (1853–1937), English architect
Ike Turner (1931–2007), American musician
J. M. W. Turner (1775–1851), English painter
Jamie Turner (born 1972), American automobile dealer
Jane Turner (born 1967), Australian actor and comedian
Janine Turner (born 1962), American actor
Jasmine Turner (born 1994), Maltese footballer
Jean Turner (born 1939), member of the Scottish Parliament
Jermaine Turner (born 1974), American professional basketball player
Jessie Franklin Turner (1881–1956), American fashion designer.
Jimmie Turner (born 1962), American football player
Joe Lynn Turner (born 1951), American musician
Joe M. Turner (born 1969), American magician, mentalist and speaker
Jonathan Baldwin Turner (1805–1899), abolitionist and educational leader
Jonathan D. C. Turner (born 1958), English barrister
Josh Turner (born 1977), musician
Julian Turner (born 1955), British poet and mental health worker
Justin Turner (born 1984), American professional baseball player
Kathleen Turner (born 1954), American actor
Keena Turner (born 1958), American football player
Kenneth Turner (1928–2018), Australian political historian
B. Kevin Turner (born 1965), business executive
Lacey Turner (born 1988), English actor
Lana Turner (1921–1995), American actor
Landon Turner (born 1993), American football player
Landon Turner (basketball) (born 1960), American basketball player
Lavinia Turner (c. 1888–after 1937), American classic female blues singer
Lesley Turner Bowrey (born 1942), Australian tennis player
Lizabeth A. Turner (1829-1907), National President, Woman's Relief Corps
Loyce W. Turner (1927-2021), American politician and veterinarian
Lynn Turner (murderer) (born 1968)
Malik Turner (born 1996), American football player
Margery J. Turner, American dancer and author
Mauree Turner, American politician
Mildred Cozzens Turner (1897-1992) American artist, composer and singer
Myra Brooks Turner (1936-2017), American composer
Nat Turner (1800–1831), leader of a slave rebellion
Natalie Turner, Canadian animator
Nolan Turner (born 1997), American football player
Norv Turner (born 1952), American football coach
Othar Turner (1907–2003), American fife player and blues musician
Pamela Rogers Turner (born 1977), American teacher convicted as a sex offender
Payton Turner (born 1999), American football player
Percy Turner, English footballer
Ralph Lilley Turner (1888–1983), English Indian languages philologist and linguist
Randy Turner (1949–2005), American artist and singer for the band Big Boys
Rahshon Turner (born 1975), American basketball player
Richmond K. Turner (1885–1961), American naval officer in World War II
Rodney Turner (born 1953), British/New Zealand organizational theorist
Roy J. Turner (1894–1973), American politician
Scott Turner (born 1982), American football coach
Sharon Turner (1768–1847), English historian
Sheadrick Turner (1869–1927), American lawyer and politician
Sherri Turner (born 1956), American LPGA golfer
Shirley Turner, American politician
 Shirley Turner (1961–2003), perpetrator of the murder of Zachary Turner and his father
Sonny Turner (1939-2022), American singer
Sophie Turner, British actress
Sylvester Turner, Mayor of Houston, Texas
Stansfield Turner (1923–2018), director of the U.S. CIA
Stuart Turner, British pump designer
Sukhi Turner (born 1952), New Zealand politician, born in India
Ted Turner (born 1938), American media mogul
T. J. Turner (end), American football player
T. J. Turner (linebacker), American football player
Tina Turner (born 1939), American singer
Titus Turner (1933–1984), American R&B and East Coast blues singer and songwriter
Trea Turner (born 1993), American professional baseball player
Victor Turner (1920–1983), Scottish anthropologist
Walter J. Turner (1884–1947), Australian poet
Yaakov Turner (born 1935), mayor of Beersheba and a brigadier general in the Israeli Air Force
Zachary Turner (2002–2003), baby drowned by his mother in Canadian murder/suicide
Zeke Turner (born 1996), American football player

Fictional characters
Alan Turner (Emmerdale), played by Richard Thorp on Emmerdale
Chris Turner, a character in the 1993 TV series Journey to the Center of the Earth
Cole Turner, character in Charmed played by Julian McMahon
Darnell Turner, character played by Eddie Steeples in My Name Is Earl
Dave Turner, character in Degrassi: The Next Generation
Gus Turner, in the TV series Robotboy
Heidi Turner, minor character in South Park animated TV series
Naomi Turner from Elena of Avalor
Owen Turner, character in EastEnders
Scott Turner, a character from the 1989 film Turner and Hooch
Terence Turner, son of Alan Turner in Emmerdale, played by Stephen Marchant and then Nick Brimble
Timmy Turner, main character on the Nickelodeon animated TV series The Fairly OddParents
Mr. and Mrs. Turner, Timmy's dumb, idiotic parents
Vivian "Viv" Turner, Timmy's 13-year-old cousin and main character from The Fairly OddParents: Fairly Odder
Ty Turner, Viv's father as well as Timmy's Uncle also from Fairly Odder
Vernon Turner, character in the Fox television series Empire, played by Malik Yoba
Violet Turner, a character in Private Practice
Will Turner, fictional character, and one of the protagonists, in the Pirates of the Caribbean franchise
Bootstrap Bill Turner, Will's twice cursed pirate father
Henry Turner, Will Turner's and Elizabeth Swann's son
Sean and Dorothy Turner, main characters on Apple's 2019 show Servant
Jeanette Turner, main character on Freeform's recent miniseries Cruel Summer. Her parents are Gregory and Cindy, her elder brother is Derek.

See also
Justice Turner (disambiguation)
Turner (potters), John, and his sons John and William, a family active in that trade in England 1756–1829
C. Turner Joy (1895–1956), U.S. Navy Admiral in World War II and the Korean War

References

English-language surnames
Norman-language surnames
Occupational surnames
English-language occupational surnames